Ricardo Valdez Valentine Jr. (born June 24, 1992), known professionally as 6lack (stylized as 6LACK, pronounced "black"), is an African American singer and rapper.

He initially gained notable recognition following the release of his single, "Prblms", taken from his debut album, Free 6lack, which was released in November 2016. He released his second album, East Atlanta Love Letter in September 2018, which peaked at number three on the Billboard 200 chart. Later that year, he released the single "OTW" (with Khalid and Ty Dolla Sign). 6lack was featured on the Normani single "Waves", which earned him a MTV Video Music Award. In June 2020, he released the EP 6pc Hot, which included the single, "Know My Rights" (featuring Lil Baby). Later that year he was featured on the Gorillaz track "The Pink Phantom", with Elton John. In 2021, his single "Calling My Phone" (with Lil Tjay), topped the charts in Canada, and peaked at number three in the US, becoming both artists' highest charting song on both charts.

6lack is currently signed to Love Renaissance and Interscope Records. He is also a member of the Atlanta-Baltimore music collective Spillage Village, founded by EarthGang and JID. 6lack has received three Grammy Award nominations and has won an MTV Video Music Award.

Early life
Ricardo Valdez Valentine Jr. was born on June 24, 1992, in Baltimore, Maryland, and moved to Atlanta, Georgia, with his parents in 1997. He attended Stone Mountain High School and Newton High School. He is the oldest of three siblings. Valentine's first recording experience was when he was 4 years of age, at his father's studio. He began rapping in middle school as a battle rapper and was involved in many battles in his youth including against rapper Young Thug.

Career

2011–2017: Beginnings and Free 6lack

6lack signed a record deal with Flo Rida's International Music Group and Strong Arm Records in July 2011. He left Valdosta State University once he signed, and spent the next few years learning about the industry. 6lack spent five years with the label, putting music out on his SoundCloud account. 6lack had little financial security and spent most of his time sleeping in the studio or outside on the street after moving to Miami, Florida to work on music with the record label. 6lack eventually left his label due to issues over artistic and creative license and management. In 2015, 6lack announced that he had joined the musical collective Spillage Village after living with the members of EarthGang, and appeared on four tracks of Spillage Village EP called Bears Like This Too in 2015.

Once he left the label, he signed with Love Renaissance and Interscope Records. In November 2016, Rolling Stone included 6lack in their list of "10 New Artists You Need to Know". He then went on to release his debut studio album, Free 6lack, which peaked at number 34 on the Billboard 200 chart. The album's single "Prblms" peaked at number 73 on the Billboard Hot 100 chart and became his first platinum record. In April 2017, he joined Canadian singer The Weeknd as opening act for his Legend of the Fall tour in North America.

2018–present: East Atlanta Love Letter and 6pc Hot
In April 2018, he released the single "OTW" with Khalid and Ty Dolla Sign, which has reached at number 57 on the Billboard Hot 100. "OTW" became 6lack's highest peaking song on the Hot 100. The first single for his sophomore album, "Switch", was released on June 22, 2018, with a music video released on July 16. "Nonchalant" was released as the album's second single on August 17, with its accompanying music video. On September 14, 2018, 6lack released his second studio album, East Atlanta Love Letter, featuring guest appearances from Future, J. Cole, Offset, and Khalid.  The album's release was preceded by the singles "Switch" and "Nonchalant." In October 2018, 6lack started a tour for the promotion of the album, with opening acts THEY., Tierra Whack, Boogie, Deante' Hitchcock, Summer Walker, and Ari Lennox. 6lack later featured on several other songs, such as "Waves" by Normani. and "Crowded Room" by Selena Gomez, in 2019 and early 2020, respectively. 
In May 2020, 6lack released the track "ATL Freestyle". A few weeks later, on June 24, 2020, 6lack celebrated his birthday with the release of the single "Float". He also announced his EP 6pc Hot, which was released on June 26 and included the Lil Baby-assisted single, "Know My Rights". He also launched his own hot sauce brand 600 Degrees Original.
6lack appeared on two tracks from Spillage Village's Spilligion album, released in September 2020. During 2020, he collaborated with British virtual band Gorillaz and singer-songwriter Elton John on the track "The Pink Phantom", for the band's seventh studio album, Song Machine, Season One: Strange Timez.

In 2021, he released "Calling My Phone" with Bronx rapper Lil Tjay.

Artistry 
6lack's music focuses or is based on personal and business relationships frequently, especially the topic of heartbreak. 6lack has said that his songwriting is influenced mainly by his personal experiences and failed relationships. Billboard magazine has described 6lack's music as "moody hip hop" that "spotlights vulnerability and honesty in a way the emoji generation can understand." 6lack has cited Sade, T-Pain, The-Dream, and Usher as his influences.

Personal life
In February 2017, 6lack announced the birth of his daughter, Syx Rose Valentine. He is currently dating soul singer Bianca Quiñones, known by her stage name Quiñ.

Discography 

Free 6lack (2016)
East Atlanta Love Letter (2018)
Since I Have a Lover (2023)

Tours 
Headlining

 Free 6lack Tour (2017)
From East Atlanta with Love Tour (2018)
Supporting
Starboy: Legend of the Fall Tour  (2017)
Heartbreak on a Full Moon Tour  (2018)

Awards and nominations

References

External links
 

1992 births
Living people
21st-century African-American male singers
African-American male singer-songwriters
Singer-songwriters from Georgia (U.S. state)
Singer-songwriters from Maryland
African-American male rappers
Interscope Records artists
Rappers from Atlanta
Pop rappers
21st-century American rappers
American contemporary R&B singers